Plum Run is an unincorporated community in Tyler County, West Virginia, United States, along McKim Creek.  It was also known as Plum. The Plum post office is closed.

References 

Unincorporated communities in West Virginia
Unincorporated communities in Tyler County, West Virginia